The South Norwalk Railroad Bridge is an 1895 bridge in Norwalk, Connecticut. It carries the four sets of Metro-North railroad tracks across the busy intersection of Main Street and Washington Street in the South Norwalk section of the city. The bridge is adjacent to the South Norwalk Switch Tower Museum, which showcases the railroad switch tower where tracks were physically switched at the intersection of the Danbury Branch and the New Haven Line.

The bridge is a contributing structure in the South Main and Washington Streets Historic District.

References

External links

SoNo Switch Tower Museum

Bridges completed in 1895
Railroad bridges in Connecticut
Bridges in Fairfield County, Connecticut
Buildings and structures in Norwalk, Connecticut
Historic district contributing properties in Connecticut
Historic American Engineering Record in Connecticut
National Register of Historic Places in Fairfield County, Connecticut
Railroad bridges on the National Register of Historic Places in Connecticut
Pratt truss bridges in the United States
Metal bridges in the United States